Sunderabad railway station is a small railway station in Ujjain district, Madhya Pradesh. Its code is RNJ. It serves Runija area. The station consists of a single platform which is well sheltered. .

References

Railway stations in Ratlam district
Ratlam railway division